Novorossiyka is a rural locality (a selo) and the administrative center of Novorossiysky Selsoviet of Mazanovsky District, Amur Oblast, Russia. The population was 278 as of 2018. There are 5 streets.

Geography 
Novorossiyka is located on the left bank of the Selemdzha River, 79 km northeast of Novokiyevsky Uval (the district's administrative centre) by road. Abaykan is the nearest rural locality.

References 

Rural localities in Mazanovsky District